Du Changjie (born 20 December 1997) is a Chinese footballer who currently plays for Shaanxi Chang'an Athletic in the China League One.

Club career
Du Changjie joined Henan Jianye's U-15 academy in 2010. In April 2014, he made a brief trial with Bundesliga side Eintracht Frankfurt after his impressive performance at Henan Jianye. He was promoted to Henan Jianye's first team squad in the 2015 season. He made his senior debut on 23 April 2017, in a 1–0 away defeat against Changchun Yatai, coming on as a substitute for Liu Heng in the 84th minute.

Career statistics
.

References

External links
 

1997 births
Living people
Chinese footballers
People from Zhengzhou
Footballers from Henan
Henan Songshan Longmen F.C. players
Chinese Super League players
Association football forwards